David Camhi (born August 26, 1972) is a football manager. In January 2016, he was appointed manager of Baotou Nanjiao F.C. in China.

External links

References
David Camhi's official website

1972 births
Living people
Sportspeople from Nice
French football managers
French expatriate football managers
French expatriate sportspeople in China
Expatriate football managers in China